Franklin M. Jahnke (April 20, 1900 – July 3, 1979) was a member of the Wisconsin State Assembly, representing Green Lake and Waushara counties.

Biography
Jahnke was born on April 20, 1900 in the Town of Marquette, Wisconsin. He became a dairy farmer. He died at St. Agnes Hospital in Fond du Lac, Wisconsin in 1979.

Political career
Jahnke was a member of the Assembly from 1957 to 1969. Additionally, he was Chairman of the Town of Marquette from 1933 to 1964 and of the Green Lake County, Wisconsin Board from 1944 to 1965. He was a Republican.

References

People from Marquette, Wisconsin
Farmers from Wisconsin
Mayors of places in Wisconsin
County supervisors in Wisconsin
Republican Party members of the Wisconsin State Assembly
1900 births
1979 deaths
20th-century American politicians